Neith  (a borrowing of the Demotic form , likely originally to have been nrt "she is the terrifying one"; Coptic: ⲛⲏⲓⲧ; also spelled Nit, Net, or Neit) was an early ancient Egyptian deity. She was said to be the first and the prime creator, who created the universe and all it contains, and that she governs how it functions. She was the goddess of the cosmos, fate, wisdom, water, rivers, mothers, childbirth, hunting, weaving, and war.

Neith was the tutelary deity of Sais ( Sai from Egyptian Zau), where her cult was centered in the western Nile Delta of Lower Egypt. It is attested as early as the First Dynasty. Neith was also one of the three tutelary deities of the southern city of Latopolis or Esna (Snē) (Sahidic Coptic:  from earlier Egyptian: t3-snt, also iwnyt).

Symbolism

In her usual representations, she is portrayed as a fierce deity, a woman wearing the Red Crown, occasionally holding or using the bow and arrow, in others, a harpoon. Neith also is a goddess of war and of hunting and that is the symbolism depicted most often. Her symbol was two arrows crossed over a shield. The hieroglyphs of her name usually are followed by a determinative containing the archery elements, with the shield symbol of the name being explained as either double bows (facing one another), intersected by two arrows (usually lashed to the bows), or, by other imagery associated with her worship. Her symbol also identified the city of Sais. This symbol was displayed on top of her head in Egyptian art. In her form as a goddess of war, she was said to make the weapons of warriors and to guard their bodies when they died.

As a deity, Neith is normally shown carrying the was scepter (symbol of rule and power) and the ankh (symbol of life). She is called such cosmic epithets as the "Cow of Heaven", a sky-goddess similar to Nut, and as the Great Flood, Mehet-Weret, as a cow who gives birth to the sun daily. In these forms, she is associated with the creation of both the primeval time and the daily "re-creation". As protectress of the Royal House, she is represented as a uraeus, and functions with the fiery fury of the sun. In time, this led to her being considered as the personification of the primordial waters of creation.

Later, as religious practices evolved throughout the long history of their culture, ancient Egyptians began to note their deities in pairs, female and male. When that tradition arose, Neith was paired with Ptah-Nun. In the same manner, her personification as the primeval waters is Mehet-Weret, conceptualized as streaming water, related to another use of the verb sti, meaning 'to pour'.

Neith is one of the most ancient deities associated with ancient Egyptian culture. Flinders Petrie (Diopolis Parva, 1901) noted the earliest depictions of her standards were known in predynastic periods, as can be seen from a representation of a barque bearing her crossed arrow standards in the Predynastic Period, as is displayed in the Ashmolean Museum, Oxford.

Her first anthropomorphic representations occur in the early dynastic period, on a diorite vase of King Ny-Netjer of the Second Dynasty. The vase was found in the Step Pyramid of Djoser (Third Dynasty) at Saqqara. That her worship predominated the early dynastic periods is demonstrated by a preponderance of theophoric names (personal names that incorporate the name of a deity) within which Neith appears as an element. Predominance of Neith's name in nearly forty percent of early dynastic names, and particularly in the names of four royal women of the First Dynasty, clearly emphasizes the importance of this goddess in relation to the early society of Egypt, with special emphasis on association with the Royal House.

In the very early periods of Egyptian history, the main iconographic representations of this goddess appear to have been limited to her hunting and war characteristics, although there is no Egyptian mythological reference to support the concept that this was her primary function as a deity. It has been suggested these hunting and war features of Neith's imagery may indicate her origin from Libya, located west and southwest of Egypt, where she was the goddess of the combative peoples there.

It has been theorized that Neith's primary cult point in the Old Kingdom was established in Saïs (modern Sa el-Hagar) by Hor-Aha of the First Dynasty, in an effort to placate the residents of Lower Egypt by the ruler of the unified country. Textual and iconographic evidence indicates that she was a national goddess for Old Kingdom Egypt, with her own sanctuary in Memphis, indicating the high regard held for her. There, she was known as "North of her Wall", as counterpoise to Ptah's "South of his Wall" epithet. While Neith is generally regarded as a deity of Lower Egypt, her worship was not consistently located in that delta region. Her cult reached its height in Saïs and apparently in Memphis in the Old Kingdom, and remained important, although to a lesser extent, through the Middle and New Kingdom. Her cult regained cultural prominence again during the twenty-sixth dynasty when worship at Saïs flourished again, as well as at Esna in Upper Egypt.
 
Neith's symbol and part of her hieroglyph also bore a resemblance to a loom, and so in later syncretisation of Egyptian myths by the Greek ruling class of that time, she also became the goddess of weaving. At this time her role as a creator was conflated with that of Athena, as a Greek deity who wove all of the world and existence into being on her loom.

Sometimes Neith was pictured as a woman nursing a baby crocodile, and she then was addressed with the title, "Nurse of Crocodiles", reflecting a southern provincial mythology in Upper Egypt that she served as either the mother of the crocodile god, Sobek. As the mother of Ra, in her Mehet-Weret form, she was sometimes described as the "Great Cow who gave birth to Ra". As a maternal figure (beyond being the birth-mother of the sun-god Ra), Neith is associated with Sobek as her son (as early as the Pyramid Texts), but in later religious conventions that paired deities, no male deity is consistently identified with her in a pair and so, she often is represented without one. Later triad associations made with her have little or no religious or mythological supporting references, appearing to have been made by political or regional associations only.

Some modern writers assert that they may interpret that as her being 'androgynous', since Neith is the creator capable of giving birth without a partner (asexually) and without association of creation with sexual imagery, as seen in the myths of Atum and other creator deities. However, her name always appears as feminine. Erik Hornung interprets that in the Eleventh Hour of the Book of the Amduat, Neith's name appears written with a phallus (Das Amduat, Teil I: Text: 188, No. 800.(Äg. Abh., Band 7, Wiesbaden) 1963). See also Ramadan el-Sayed, La Déese Neith de Saïs, I:16; 58-60, for both hieroglyphic rendering and discussion of an androgynous nature of Neith as creator/creatress deity, and Lexikon der Ägyptologie (LÄ I) under "Götter, androgyne": 634-635 (W. Westendorf, ed., Harassowitz, Wiesbaden, 1977). In reference to Neith's function as creator with both male and female characteristics, Peter Kaplony has said in the Lexikon der Ägyptologie: "Die Deutung von Neith als Njt "Verneinung" ist sekundär. Neith ist die weibliche Entsprechung zu Nw(w), dem Gott der Urflut (Nun and Naunet). (Citing Sethe, Amun, § 139)". LÄ II: 1118 (Harassowitz, Wiesbaden, 1977). She was considered to be eldest of the Ancient Egyptian deities. Neith is said to have been "born the first, in the time when as yet there had been no birth" (St. Clair, Creation Records: 176).

In the Pyramid Texts, Neith is paired with the goddess Selket as the two braces for the sky, which places these goddesses as the supports for the heavens (see PT 1040a-d, following J. Gwyn Griffths, The Conflict of Horus and Seth, (London, 1961) p. 1). This ties in with the vignette in The Contendings of Horus and Seth when, as the most ancient among them, Neith is asked by the deities to decide who should rule. She was appealed to as an arbiter in the dispute between Horus and Seth. In her message of reply, Neith selects Horus, and says she will "cause the sky to crash to the earth" if he is not selected.

Attributes

An analysis of her attributes shows Neith was a goddess with many roles. From predynastic and early dynasty periods, she was referred to as an "Opener of the Ways" (same as Wepwawet), which may have referred, not only to her leadership in hunting and war but also as a psychopomp in cosmic and underworld pathways, escorting souls. References to Neith as the "Opener of Paths" occurs in Dynasty Four through Dynasty Six, and Neith is seen in the titles of women serving as priestesses of the goddess. Such epithets include: "Priestess of Neith who opens all the (path)ways", "Priestess of Neith who opens the good pathways", "Priestess of Neith who opens the way in all her places". (el-Sayed, I: 67-69). el-Sayed asserts his belief that Neith should be seen as a parallel to Wepwawet, the ancient jackal god of Upper Egypt, who was associated in that southern region with both royalty in victory and as a psychopomp for the dead.

The main imagery of Neith as Wepwawet was as the deity of the unseen and limitless sky, as opposed to representations of Nut and Hathor, who respectively represented the manifested night and day skies. Neith's epithet as the "Opener of the Sun's paths in all her stations" refers to how the sun is reborn (due to seasonal changes) at various points in the sky, under Neith's control of all beyond the visible world, of which only a glimpse is revealed prior to dawn and after sunset. It is at these changing points that Neith reigns as a form of sky goddess, where the sun rises and sets daily, or at its 'first appearance' to the sky above and below. It is at these points, beyond the sky that is seen, that Neith's true power as the deity who creates life is manifested.

Georges St. Clair (Creation Records, 1898) noted that Neith is represented at times as a cow goddess with a line of stars across her back (as opposed to representations of Nut with stars across the belly) [See el-Sayed, II, Doc. 644], and maintained this indicated that Neith represents the full ecliptic circle around the sky (above and below), and is seen iconographically in ancient texts as both the regular and the inverted determinative for the heavenly vault, indicating the cosmos below the horizon. St. Clair maintained it was this realm that Neith personified, for she is the complete sky that surrounds the upper (Nut) and lower (Nunet?) sky, and who exists beyond the horizon, and thereby, beyond the skies themselves. Neith, then, is that portion of the cosmos that is not seen, and in which the sun is reborn daily, below the horizon (which may reflect the statement assigned to Neith as "I come at dawn and at sunset daily").

Since Neith also was goddess of war, she thus had an additional association with death: in this function, she shot her arrows into the enemies of the dead, and thus she began to be viewed as a protector of the dead, often appearing as a uraeus snake to drive off intruders and those who would harm the deceased (in this form she is represented in the tomb of Tutankhamun). She also is shown as the protectress of one of the Four sons of Horus, specifically, of Duamutef, the deification of the canopic jar storing the stomach, since the abdomen (often mistakenly associated as the stomach) was the most vulnerable portion of the body and a prime target during battle.

Mythology

In some ancient Egyptian creation myths, Neith was identified as the mother of Ra and Apep. When she was identified as a water goddess, she was viewed as the mother of Sobek, the crocodile. It was because of this association with water, i.e. the Nile, that during pairing of deities she sometimes was considered the wife of Khnum and sometimes was associated with the source of the River Nile. In that cult center, she also was associated with the Nile Perch as well as being the goddess of the triad.

As the goddess of creation and weaving, she was said to reweave the world on her loom daily. An interior wall of the temple at Esna records an account of creation in which Neith brings forth the Nun, the first land, from the primeval waters. All that she conceived in her heart comes into being, including all thirty deities. Having no husband she has been described as "Virgin Mother Goddess":

Proclus (412–485 AD) wrote that the adyton of the temple of Neith in Sais (of which nothing now remains) carried the following inscription:

It was said that Neith interceded in the kingly war between Horus and Set, over the Egyptian throne, recommending that Horus rule.

A great festival, called the Feast of Lamps, was held annually in honor of Neith and, according to the Greek historian Herodotus, her devotees burned a multitude of lights in the open air all night during the celebration.

Syncretic relationships

The Greek historian Herodotus (c. 484–425 BC) noted that the Egyptian citizens of Sais in Egypt worshipped Neith. The Greeks sought to draw a syncretic relationship to associate Egyptian deities with those of Greece. They identified Neith with Athena. The Timaeus, a dialogue written by Plato, mirrors that identification with Athena, possibly as a result of the identification of both goddesses with war and weaving.

The English Egyptologist E. A. Wallis Budge suggested that the Christian biblical account of the flight into Egypt as recorded in the apocryphal gospels was directly influenced by stories about Isis and Horus; Budge argued that the writers of these gospels ascribed to Mary, the mother of Jesus, many peculiarities which, at the time of the rise of Christianity, were perceived as belonging to both Isis and Neith, for example, the parthenogenesis concept shared by both Neith and Mary.

In popular culture

Neith is one of several figures from Egyptian mythology included in the video game, Smite; she was added to the game in 2013.
Neith appears in The Serpent's Shadow, the final novel in Rick Riordan's Kane Chronicles trilogy. The character is depicted by Riordan as paranoid and reclusive, but nonetheless, a skilled hunter and strategist.

Neith has been speculated by some scholars, such as J. Gwyn Griffiths and Jan Assmann, to be the actual goddess depicted in the first and second century Greek historian Plutarch's description of the Veil of Isis in his On Isis and Osiris. The veiled Isis is a motif which associates her with mystery and ceremonial magic. Plutarch described the statue of a seated and veiled goddess in the Egyptian city of Sais. He identified the goddess as "Athena, whom [the Egyptians] consider to be Isis." However, Sais was the cult center of the goddess Neith, whom the Greeks compared to their goddess Athena, and could have been the goddess that Plutarch spoke of. More than 300 years after Plutarch, the Neoplatonist philosopher Proclus wrote of the same statue in Book I of his Commentaries on Plato's "Timaeus". In this version, a statement is added: "The fruit of my womb was the sun", which could further be associated with Neith, due to her being the mother of the Sun god Ra.

See also
 Neith (hypothetical moon) of Venus

People named after Neith:
 Neithhotep, wife of the first king of a unified Ancient Egypt, Narmer or of  Hor-Aha, the mother of and co-ruler with Djer, and who may have ruled in her own right during the first dynasty 
 Merneith, a woman who served as consort and regent of Ancient Egypt and who may have ruled in her own right during the first dynasty   
 Neith (wife of Pepi II) and the mother of another king of Ancient Egypt, perhaps Nemtyemsaf II
 Meryneith, official and priest of the New Kingdom

Notes

References

Further reading

 
 
 
 Altenmüller, Hartwig. "Zum Ursprung Von Isis Und Nephthys." Studien Zur Altägyptischen Kultur 27 (1999): 1-26. Accessed June 15, 2020. www.jstor.org/stable/25152793.
 El Sayed, Ramadan. "Les Rôles Attribués à La Déesse Neith Dans Certains Des Textes Des Cercueils." Orientalia, NOVA SERIES, 43 (1974): 275-94. Accessed June 15, 2020. www.jstor.org/stable/43074608.
 Hendrickx, Stan. "Two Protodynastic Objects in Brussels and the Origin of the Bilobate Cult-Sign of Neith." The Journal of Egyptian Archaeology 82 (1996): 23-42. Accessed June 15, 2020. doi:10.2307/3822112.
 
 

Chaos (cosmogony)
Childhood goddesses
Creator goddesses
Death goddesses
Egyptian goddesses
Hunting goddesses
Nile Delta
Sea and river goddesses
Sky and weather goddesses
Time and fate goddesses
Tutelary deities
War goddesses
Wisdom goddesses
Textiles in folklore
Cattle deities